The Gateway Touch Pad was an Internet appliance released on November 10, 2000 at a price of USD599.

The Touch Pad was built with a chassis (containing speakers) around a 10-inch LCD display with a touch screen for input and controlling basic functions. The CPU was the Transmeta Crusoe.

The operating system was Mobile Linux and software included the Instant AOL GUI and a version of Netscape's browser using the Gecko engine.

The unit was designed to sit on a table, kitchen counter, or desk and intended to be used solely for access to the Internet or email. It was sold bundled with AOL Internet access.

Due to slow sales it was removed from the market in October 2001.

References

External links
Skynet Accessories

Information appliances
Touch Pad